The Mississippi Valley State Delta Devils baseball team is a varsity intercollegiate athletic team of Mississippi Valley State University in Itta Bena, Mississippi, United States. The team is a member of the Southwestern Athletic Conference, which is part of the National Collegiate Athletic Association's Division I. The team plays its home games at Magnolia Field in Itta Bena, Mississippi. Milton Barney Jr. is the team's head coach starting in the 2023 season.

History
Fourteen-year head coach Doug Shanks retired on November 12, 2014. After serving as an assistant to Shanks for all 14 seasons, Aaron Stevens was promoted to head coach on December 2, 2014. On the heels of back-to-back win-less seasons in 2020 and 2021, Stevens was not retained for the 2022 season. On July 27, 2021, Stanley Stubbs was named the head coach of the Delta Devils. With the Delta Devils improving by 10 wins over the pervious season, Stubbs had done a good job helping turn around the Delta Devils fortunes, but on June 15, 2022, head coach he resigned due to health concerns. On August 11, 2022, Milton Barney Jr. was named the head coach of the Delta Devils.

Head coaches

Major League Baseball
Mississippi Valley State has had 15 Major League Baseball Draft selections since the draft began in 1965.

Notable players
 Zach Penprase (born 1985), Israeli-American baseball player for the Israel National Baseball Team

 Dion Williams Born 1964 Greenville, Mississippi 
Signed free agent contract with Boston Red Sox 1987. Son of Former MLB All-Star George “Boomer” Scott. MVP Empire State League 1987

See also
List of NCAA Division I baseball programs

References

External links